They Got Away is an EP released on July 10, 2007 by Built to Spill. "They Got Away" and "Re-Arrange" are reggae-inspired studio tracks recorded while the band toured in 2006. The second track is a cover of a song by The Gladiators.

Track listing
 "They Got Away"
 "Re-Arrange" (originally by The Gladiators)

Built to Spill albums
2007 EPs
Warner Records EPs